The 1977 Chicago Cubs season was the 106th season of the Chicago Cubs franchise, the 102nd in the National League and the 62nd at Wrigley Field. The Cubs finished fourth in the National League East with a record of 81–81, 20 games behind the Philadelphia Phillies.

Offseason 
On November 24, 1976, Bob Kennedy was named head of baseball operations for the Cubs. His first move was to inform Jim Marshall that he was fired as manager. Salty Saltwell‚ after a year as general manager‚ was named secretary and director of park operations. After Leo Durocher turned down an offer from Cubs owner Philip K. Wrigley to manage the Cubs for the 1977 season, Herman Franks‚ who had briefly been a Cubs coach under Leo Durocher‚ was named the new manager.

Notable transactions 
 December 6, 1976: Willie Hernández was drafted by the Cubs from the Philadelphia Phillies in the 1976 rule 5 draft.
 December 8, 1976: Julio González was traded by the Cubs to the Houston Astros for Greg Gross.
 January 11, 1977: Rick Monday and Mike Garman were traded by Cubs to the Los Angeles Dodgers for Bill Buckner, Iván DeJesús and Jeff Albert (minors).
 January 17, 1977: Geoff Zahn was released by the Cubs.
 February 5, 1977: Darold Knowles was traded by the Cubs to the Texas Rangers for a player to be named later and cash. The Rangers completed the trade by sending Gene Clines to the Cubs on February 15.
 February 11, 1977: Bill Madlock and Rob Sperring were traded by the Cubs to the San Francisco Giants for Bobby Murcer, Steve Ontiveros, and Andy Muhlstock (minors).
 February 16, 1977: Champ Summers was traded by the Cubs to the Cincinnati Reds for Dave Schneck.
 February 28, 1977: Buddy Schultz was traded by the Cubs to the St. Louis Cardinals for Mark Covert (minors).
 March 15, 1977: Joe Coleman was traded by the Cubs to the Oakland Athletics for Jim Todd.
 March 15, 1977: Jerry Tabb was purchased from the Cubs by the Oakland Athletics.
 March 15, 1977: Jim Tyrone was traded by the Cubs to the Oakland Athletics for Gaylen Pitts.

Regular season 
In 1977, the franchise experienced one of its biggest collapses. The Cubs hit a high-water mark on June 28 at 47–22 with an 8½-game National League East lead led by Bobby Murcer, who had 27 home runs and 89 RBI overall during the season, and Rick Reuschel, who had a record of 20–10. However, the Philadelphia Phillies cut the lead to two by the All-Star break, as the Cubs sat 19 games over .500, and the Cubs swooned late in the season, going 20–40 after July 31, finishing in fourth place at 81–81.

On July 28, with the Cubs down 14–10 in the eighth inning of a game against the Cincinnati Reds, the Cubs pinch-hit for both of their middle infielders, replacing shortstop Iván DeJesús with José Cardenal and second baseman Mick Kelleher with Greg Gross. The Cubs scored three runs, making the score 14–13 going into the ninth inning. Since both replacements were typically outfielders, and the Cubs had just one player left on the bench who normally played middle infield to enter the game in the ninth inning, utilityman Dave Rosello, the Cubs allowed Cardenal to stay in the game and play second base while Rosello entered the game at shortstop. Rosello and Cardenal alternated between the two positions during the ninth inning depending on whether the batter was a left-handed or right-handed hitter. The Reds failed to score in the ninth, and the Cubs tied the game, forcing extra innings. At that point, the Cubs moved Cardenal to right field, and brought Bobby Murcer in to play the infield instead, continuing to flip-flop the positioning of Rosello and Murcer for the remainder of the game, which wound up going thirteen innings. In all, Rosello wound up switching positions twelve times, and Murcer eight times.

Season standings

Record vs. opponents

Notable transactions 
 April 20, 1977: The Cubs traded a player to be named later to the Seattle Mariners for Pete Broberg. The Cubs completed the deal by sending Jim Todd to the Mariners on October 25.
 May 28, 1977: Ramón Hernández was traded by the Cubs to the Boston Red Sox for Bobby Darwin.
 June 7, 1977: Terry Francona was drafted by the Cubs in the 2nd round of the 1977 Major League Baseball Draft, but did not sign.
 August 23, 1977: Bobby Darwin was released by the Cubs.
 September 28, 1977: Rudy Meoli was purchased by the Cubs from the Cincinnati Reds.

Roster

Player stats

Batting

Starters by position 
Note: Pos = Position; G = Games played; AB = At bats; H = Hits; Avg. = Batting average; HR = Home runs; RBI = Runs batted in

Other batters 
Note: G = Games played; AB = At bats; H = Hits; Avg. = Batting average; HR = Home runs; RBI = Runs batted in

Pitching

Starting pitchers 
Note: G = Games pitched; IP = Innings pitched; W = Wins; L = Losses; ERA = Earned run average; SO = Strikeouts

Other pitchers 
Note: G = Games pitched; IP = Innings pitched; W = Wins; L = Losses; ERA = Earned run average; SO = Strikeouts

Relief pitchers 
Note: G = Games pitched; W = Wins; L = Losses; SV = Saves; ERA = Earned run average; SO = Strikeouts

Farm system

Notes

References 

1977 Chicago Cubs season at Baseball Reference

Chicago Cubs seasons
Chicago Cubs season
Chicago Cubs